The , known under current sponsorship as ,  is a multi-purpose stadium in Hiroshima, Japan. It used mostly for association football matches and also for athletics. The venue is the home of J. League club Sanfrecce Hiroshima. It has a capacity of 36,894. It is an all-seater. It was formerly known as Hiroshima Park Stadium.

History
Hiroshima Big Arch opened in 1992, as the venue of 1992 AFC Asian Cup. The host nation Japan won the Asian Cup title for the first time, after defeating the defending champion Saudi Arabia 1–0 in the final at this stadium.

The stadium hosted the 1994 Asian Games.

Access
The stadium is accessible via train services, with the Kōiki-kōen-mae Station on the Astram Line located only 5 minutes' walk from the stadium.

References

External links

 Sanfrecce Hiroshima website
  Official website

Sanfrecce Hiroshima

Football venues in Japan
AFC Asian Cup stadiums
Sports venues completed in 1992
Sports venues in Hiroshima
Stadiums of the Asian Games
Venues of the 1994 Asian Games
Asian Games athletics venues
Asian Games football venues
Athletics (track and field) venues in Japan
Multi-purpose stadiums in Japan
1992 establishments in Japan